Spaceflight (or space flight) is an application of astronautics to fly spacecraft into or through outer space, either with or without humans on board. Most spaceflight is uncrewed and conducted mainly with spacecraft such as satellites in orbit around Earth, but also includes space probes for flights beyond Earth orbit. Such spaceflight operates either by telerobotic or autonomous control. The more complex human spaceflight has been pursued soon after the first orbital satellites and has reached the Moon and permanent human presence in space around Earth, particularly with the use of space stations. Human spaceflight programs include the Soyuz, Shenzhou, the past Apollo Moon landing and the Space Shuttle programs, with currently the International Space Station as the main destination of human spaceflight missions while China's Tiangong Space Station is under construction.

Spaceflight is used for placing in Earth's orbit communications satellites, reconnaissance satellites, Earth observation satellites, but also for space exploration such as space observatories and space probes, or even for space tourism.

Spaceflight can be achieved with different types of launch systems, conventionally by rocket launching, which provide the initial thrust to overcome the force of gravity and propel a spacecraft from the surface of the Earth. Once in space, the motion of a spacecraft—both when unpropelled and when under propulsion—is covered by the area of study called astrodynamics.

Some spacecraft remain in space practically indefinitely, which has created the issue of space pollution in the form of light pollution and space junk, which is a hazard to spaceflight. Otherwise spacecraft are terminated by atmospheric reentry, in which they disintegrate, or if they do not, their reentry is mostly controlled to safely reach a surface by landing or impacting, often being dumped in the oceanic spacecraft cemetery. As such spacecraft have been the subject of some space traffic management.

Terminology 
There are several terms that refer to a flight into or through outer space.

A space mission refers to a spaceflight intended to achieve an objective. Objectives for space missions may include space exploration, space research, and national firsts in spaceflight.

Space transport is the use of spacecraft to transport people or cargo into or through outer space. This may include human spaceflight and cargo spacecraft flight.

History 

The first theoretical proposal of space travel using rockets was published by Scottish astronomer and mathematician William Leitch, in an 1861 essay "A Journey Through Space". More well-known (though not widely outside Russia) is Konstantin Tsiolkovsky's work, "" (The Exploration of Cosmic Space by Means of Reaction Devices), published in 1903.

Spaceflight became an engineering possibility with the work of Robert H. Goddard's publication in 1919 of his paper A Method of Reaching Extreme Altitudes. His application of the de Laval nozzle to liquid fuel rockets improved efficiency enough for interplanetary travel to become possible. He also proved in the laboratory that rockets would work in the vacuum of space; nonetheless, his work was not taken seriously by the public. His attempt to secure an Army contract for a rocket-propelled weapon in the first World War was defeated by the November 11, 1918 armistice with Germany. Working with private financial support, he was the first to launch a liquid-fueled rocket in 1926. Goddard's papers were highly influential internationally in his field.

The world's first large-scale experimental rocket program was Opel RAK under the leadership of Fritz von Opel and Max Valier during the late 1920s leading to the first piloted rocket cars and rocket planes, which paved the way for the Nazi era V2 program and US and Soviet activities from 1950 onwards.The Opel RAK program and the spectacular public demonstrations of ground and air vehicles drew large crowds, as well as caused global public excitement as so-called "Rocket Rumble" and had a large long-lasting impact on later spaceflight pioneers like Wernher von Braun.  

In the course of World War II the first guided rockets, the V-2 were developed and employed as weapons by Nazi Germany. At the end of World War II, most of the V-2 rocket team including its head Wernher von Braun surrendered to the United States, and were expatriated to work on American missiles at what became the Army Ballistic Missile Agency, producing missiles such as Juno I and Atlas.

At that time the Soviet Union under Joseph Stalin was developing intercontinental ballistic missiles to carry nuclear weapons as a counter measure to United States bomber planes. The Tsiolkovsky influenced Sergey Korolev became the chief rocket designer, derivatives of his R-7 Semyorka missiles were used to launch the world's first artificial Earth satellite, Sputnik 1, on October 4, 1957, and later the first human to orbit the Earth, Yuri Gagarin in Vostok 1, on April 12, 1961.

The first US satellite was Explorer 1, launched on February 1, 1958, and the first American in orbit, became John Glenn in Friendship 7 on February 20, 1962. As director of the Marshall Space Flight Center, Von Braun oversaw development of a larger class of rocket called Saturn, which allowed the US to send the first two humans, Neil Armstrong and Buzz Aldrin, to the Moon and back on Apollo 11 in July 1969. At the same time, the Soviet Union secretly tried but failed to develop the N1 rocket, meant to give them the capability to land humans on the Moon.

Ever since spaceflight has been widely employed for placing satellites into orbit around Earth for a broad range of purposes, for sending uncrewed spacecraft exploring space beyond the Moon and having continuous crewed human presence in space with a series of space stations, from the salyut program to the International Space Station.

Phases

Launch 

Rockets are the only means currently capable of reaching orbit or beyond. Other non-rocket spacelaunch technologies have yet to be built, or remain short of orbital speeds.
A rocket launch for a spaceflight usually starts from a spaceport (cosmodrome), which may be equipped with launch complexes and launch pads for vertical rocket launches and runways for takeoff and landing of carrier airplanes and winged spacecraft. Spaceports are situated well away from human habitation for noise and safety reasons. ICBMs have various special launching facilities.

A launch is often restricted to certain launch windows. These windows depend upon the position of celestial bodies and orbits relative to the launch site. The biggest influence is often the rotation of the Earth itself. Once launched, orbits are normally located within relatively constant flat planes at a fixed angle to the axis of the Earth, and the Earth rotates within this orbit.

A launch pad is a fixed structure designed to dispatch airborne vehicles. It generally consists of a launch tower and flame trench. It is surrounded by equipment used to erect, fuel, and maintain launch vehicles. Before launch, the rocket can weigh many hundreds of tonnes.

Reaching space 
The United States sometimes defines outer space as everything beyond  in altitude.

Rocket engines are the only currently practical means of reaching space. Conventional airplane engines cannot reach space due to the lack of oxygen. Rocket engines expel propellant to provide forward thrust that generates enough delta-v (change in velocity) to reach orbit.

For crewed launch systems launch escape systems are frequently fitted to allow astronauts to escape in the case of emergency.

Alternatives 

Many ways to reach space other than rocket engines have been proposed. Ideas such as the space elevator, and momentum exchange tethers like rotovators or skyhooks require new materials much stronger than any currently known. Electromagnetic launchers such as launch loops might be feasible with current technology. Other ideas include rocket assisted aircraft/spaceplanes such as Reaction Engines Skylon (currently in early stage development), scramjet powered spaceplanes, and RBCC powered spaceplanes. Gun launch has been proposed for cargo.

Leaving orbit 

Achieving a closed orbit is not essential to lunar and interplanetary voyages. Early Soviet space vehicles successfully achieved very high altitudes without going into orbit. NASA considered launching Apollo missions directly into lunar trajectories but adopted the strategy of first entering a temporary parking orbit and then performing a separate burn several orbits later onto a lunar trajectory.

The parking orbit approach greatly simplified Apollo mission planning in several important ways. It acted as a "time buffer" and substantially widened the allowable launch windows. The parking orbit gave the crew and controllers several hours to thoroughly check out the spacecraft after the stresses of launch before committing it for a long journey to the Moon.

Apollo missions minimized the performance penalty of the parking orbit by keeping its altitude as low as possible.

Robotic missions do not require an abort capability or radiation minimization, and because modern launchers routinely meet "instantaneous" launch windows, space probes to the Moon and other planets generally use direct injection to maximize performance. Although some might coast briefly during the launch sequence, they do not complete one or more full parking orbits before the burn that injects them onto an Earth escape trajectory.

The escape velocity from a celestial body decreases with altitude above that body. However, it is more fuel-efficient for a craft to burn its fuel as close to the ground as possible; see Oberth effect and reference. This is another
way to explain the performance penalty associated with establishing the safe perigee of a parking orbit.

Astrodynamics 

Astrodynamics is the study of spacecraft trajectories, particularly as they relate to gravitational and propulsion effects. Astrodynamics allows for a spacecraft to arrive at its destination at the correct time without excessive propellant use. An orbital maneuvering system may be needed to maintain or change orbits.

Non-rocket orbital propulsion methods include solar sails, magnetic sails, plasma-bubble magnetic systems, and using gravitational slingshot effects.

Transfer energy 
The term "transfer energy" means the total amount of energy imparted by a rocket stage to its payload.  This can be the energy imparted by a first stage of a launch vehicle to an upper stage plus payload, or by an upper stage or spacecraft kick motor to a spacecraft.

Reaching space station 

In order to reach towards a space station, a spacecraft would have to arrive at the same orbit and approach to a very close distance (e.g. within visual contact). This is done by a set of orbital maneuvers called space rendezvous.

After rendezvousing with the space station, the space vehicle then docks or berths with the station. Docking refers to joining of two separate free-flying space vehicles, while berthing refers to mating operations where an inactive vehicle is placed into the mating interface of another space vehicle by using a robotic arm.

Reentry 

Vehicles in orbit have large amounts of kinetic energy. This energy must be discarded if the vehicle is to land safely without vaporizing in the atmosphere. Typically this process requires special methods to protect against aerodynamic heating. The theory behind reentry was developed by Harry Julian Allen. Based on this theory, reentry vehicles present blunt shapes to the atmosphere for reentry. Blunt shapes mean that less than 1% of the kinetic energy ends up as heat reaching the vehicle, and the remainder heats up the atmosphere.

Landing and recovery 
The Mercury, Gemini, and Apollo capsules all splashed down in the sea. These capsules were designed to land at relatively low speeds with the help of a parachute. Soviet/Russian capsules for Soyuz make use of a big parachute and braking rockets to touch down on land. Spaceplanes like the Space Shuttle land like a glider.

After a successful landing the spacecraft, its occupants, and cargo can be recovered. In some cases, recovery has occurred before landing: while a spacecraft is still descending on its parachute, it can be snagged by a specially designed aircraft. This mid-air retrieval technique was used to recover the film canisters from the Corona spy satellites.

Types

Uncrewed

Human 

The first human spaceflight was Vostok 1 on April 12, 1961, on which cosmonaut Yuri Gagarin of the USSR made one orbit around the Earth. In official Soviet documents, there is no mention of the fact that Gagarin parachuted the final seven miles. As of 2020, the only spacecraft regularly used for human spaceflight are Soyuz, Shenzhou, and Crew Dragon. The U.S. Space Shuttle fleet operated from April 1981 until July 2011. SpaceShipOne has conducted two human suborbital spaceflights.

Sub-orbital 

On a sub-orbital spaceflight the spacecraft reaches space and then returns to the atmosphere after following a (primarily) ballistic trajectory. This is usually because of insufficient specific orbital energy, in which case a suborbital flight will last only a few minutes, but it is also possible for an object with enough energy for an orbit to have a trajectory that intersects the Earth's atmosphere, sometimes after many hours. Pioneer 1 was NASA's first space probe intended to reach the Moon. A partial failure caused it to instead follow a suborbital trajectory to an altitude of  before reentering the Earth's atmosphere 43 hours after launch.

It is not generally recognized by the public that the increase in potential energy required to pass the Kármán line is only about 3% of the orbital energy (potential plus kinetic energy) required by the lowest possible Earth orbit (a circular orbit just above the Kármán line.) In other words, it is far easier to reach space than to stay there. On May 17, 2004, Civilian Space eXploration Team launched the GoFast rocket on a suborbital flight, the first amateur spaceflight. On June 21, 2004, SpaceShipOne was used for the first privately funded human spaceflight.

Point-to-point 
Point-to-point, or Earth to Earth transportation, is a category of sub-orbital spaceflight in which a spacecraft provides rapid transport between two terrestrial locations. A conventional airline route between London and Sydney, a flight that normally lasts over twenty hours, could be traversed in less than one hour. While no company offers this type of transportation today, SpaceX has revealed plans to do so as early as the 2020s using Starship. Suborbital spaceflight over an intercontinental distance requires a vehicle velocity that is only a little lower than the velocity required to reach low Earth orbit. If rockets are used, the size of the rocket relative to the payload is similar to an Intercontinental Ballistic Missile (ICBM). Any intercontinental spaceflight has to surmount problems of heating during atmosphere re-entry that are nearly as large as those faced by orbital spaceflight.

Orbital 

A minimal orbital spaceflight requires much higher velocities than a minimal sub-orbital flight, and so it is technologically much more challenging to achieve. To achieve orbital spaceflight, the tangential velocity around the Earth is as important as altitude. In order to perform a stable and lasting flight in space, the spacecraft must reach the minimal orbital speed required for a closed orbit.

Interplanetary 

Interplanetary spaceflight is flight between planets within a single planetary system. In practice, the use of the term is confined to travel between the planets of our Solar System. Plans for future crewed interplanetary spaceflight missions often include final vehicle assembly in Earth orbit, such as NASA's Constellation program and Russia's Kliper/Parom tandem.

Interstellar 

‘’New Horizons’’ is the fifth spacecraft put on an escape trajectory leaving the Solar System.  Voyager 1, Voyager 2, Pioneer 10, Pioneer 11 are the earlier ones.  The one farthest from the Sun is Voyager 1, which is more than 100 AU distant and is moving at 3.6 AU per year. In comparison, Proxima Centauri, the closest star other than the Sun, is 267,000 AU distant. It will take Voyager 1 over 74,000 years to reach this distance. Vehicle designs using other techniques, such as nuclear pulse propulsion are likely to be able to reach the nearest star significantly faster. Another possibility that could allow for human interstellar spaceflight is to make use of time dilation, as this would make it possible for passengers in a fast-moving vehicle to travel further into the future while aging very little, in that their great speed slows down the rate of passage of on-board time.  However, attaining such high speeds would still require the use of some new, advanced method of propulsion. Dynamic soaring as a way to travel across interstellar space has been proposed as well.

Intergalactic 

Intergalactic travel involves spaceflight between galaxies, and is considered much more technologically demanding than even interstellar travel and, by current engineering terms, is considered science fiction. However, theoretically speaking, there is nothing to conclusively indicate that intergalactic travel is impossible. To date several academics have studied intergalactic travel in a serious manner.

Spacecraft 

Spacecraft are vehicles capable of controlling their trajectory through space.

The first 'true spacecraft' is sometimes said to be Apollo Lunar Module, since this was the only crewed vehicle to have been designed for, and operated only in space; and is notable for its non-aerodynamic shape.

Propulsion 

Spacecraft today predominantly use rockets for propulsion, but other propulsion techniques such as ion drives are becoming more common, particularly for uncrewed vehicles, and this can significantly reduce the vehicle's mass and increase its delta-v.

Launch systems 

Launch systems are used to carry a payload from Earth's surface into outer space.

Expendable 

Most current spaceflight uses multi-stage expendable launch systems to reach space.

Reusable 

The first reusable spacecraft, the X-15, was air-launched on a suborbital trajectory on 19 July 1963. The first partially reusable orbital spacecraft, the Space Shuttle, was launched by the USA on the 20th anniversary of Yuri Gagarin's flight, on 12 April 1981. During the Shuttle era, six orbiters were built, all of which flown in the atmosphere and five of which flown in space. The Enterprise was used only for approach and landing tests, launching from the back of a Boeing 747 and gliding to deadstick landings at Edwards AFB, California. The first Space Shuttle to fly into space was the Columbia, followed by the Challenger, Discovery, Atlantis, and Endeavour. The Endeavour was built to replace the Challenger, which was lost in January 1986. The Columbia broke up during reentry in February 2003.

The first automatic partially reusable spacecraft was the Buran (Snowstorm), launched by the USSR on 15 November 1988, although it made only one flight. This spaceplane was designed for a crew and strongly resembled the US Space Shuttle, although its drop-off boosters used liquid propellants and its main engines were located at the base of what would be the external tank in the American Shuttle. Lack of funding, complicated by the dissolution of the USSR, prevented any further flights of Buran.

The Space Shuttle was retired in 2011 due mainly to its old age and high cost of the program reaching over a billion dollars per flight. The Shuttle's human transport role is to be replaced by the SpaceX Dragon 2 and CST-100 in the 2020s. The Shuttle's heavy cargo transport role is now done by commercial launch vehicles.

Scaled Composites SpaceShipOne was a reusable suborbital spaceplane that carried pilots Mike Melvill and Brian Binnie on consecutive flights in 2004 to win the Ansari X Prize. The Spaceship Company has built its successor SpaceShipTwo. A fleet of SpaceShipTwos operated by Virgin Galactic planned to begin reusable private spaceflight carrying paying passengers (space tourists) in 2008, but this was delayed due to an accident in the propulsion development.

SpaceX achieved the first vertical soft landing of a re-usable orbital rocket stage on December 21, 2015, after delivering 11 Orbcomm OG-2 commercial satellites into low Earth orbit.

The first Falcon 9 second flight occurred on 30 March 2017. SpaceX now routinely recovers and reuses their first stages, with the intent of reusing fairings as well.

Challenges

Safety 

All launch vehicles contain a huge amount of energy that is needed for some part of it to reach orbit. There is therefore some risk that this energy can be released prematurely and suddenly, with significant effects.

Space is a fairly predictable environment, but there are still risks of accidental depressurization and the potential failure of equipment, some of which may be very newly developed.

In 2004 the International Association for the Advancement of Space Safety was established in the Netherlands to further international cooperation and scientific advancement in space systems safety.

Weightlessness 

In a microgravity environment such as that provided by a spacecraft in orbit around the Earth, humans experience a sense of "weightlessness." Short-term exposure to microgravity causes space adaptation syndrome, a self-limiting nausea caused by derangement of the vestibular system. Long-term exposure causes multiple health issues. The most significant is bone loss, some of which is permanent, but microgravity also leads to significant deconditioning of muscular and cardiovascular tissues.

Radiation 
Once above the atmosphere, radiation due to the Van Allen belts, solar radiation and cosmic radiation issues occur and increase. Further away from the Earth, solar flares can give a fatal radiation dose in minutes, and the health threat from cosmic radiation significantly increases the chances of cancer over a decade exposure or more.

Life support 

In human spaceflight, the life support system is a group of devices that allow a human being to survive in outer space. NASA often uses the phrase Environmental Control and Life Support System or the acronym ECLSS when describing these systems for its human spaceflight missions. The life support system may supply: air, water and food. It must also maintain the correct body temperature, an acceptable pressure on the body and deal with the body's waste products. Shielding against harmful external influences such as radiation and micro-meteorites may also be necessary. Components of the life support system are life-critical, and are designed and constructed using safety engineering techniques.

Space weather 

Space weather is the concept of changing environmental conditions in outer space. It is distinct from the concept of weather within a planetary atmosphere, and deals with phenomena involving ambient plasma, magnetic fields, radiation and other matter in space (generally close to Earth but also in interplanetary, and occasionally interstellar medium). "Space weather describes the conditions in space that affect Earth and its technological systems. Our space weather is a consequence of the behavior of the Sun, the nature of Earth's magnetic field, and our location in the Solar System."

Space weather exerts a profound influence in several areas related to space exploration and development. Changing geomagnetic conditions can induce changes in atmospheric density causing the rapid degradation of spacecraft altitude in Low Earth orbit. Geomagnetic storms due to increased solar activity can potentially blind sensors onboard spacecraft, or interfere with on-board electronics. An understanding of space environmental conditions is also important in designing shielding and life support systems for crewed spacecraft.

Environmental considerations 

Exhaust pollution of rockets depends on the produced exhausts by the propellants reactions and the location of exhaustion. They mostly exhaust greenhouse gases and sometimes toxic components. Particularly at higher levels of the atmosphere the potency of exhausted gases as greenhouse gases increases considerably

. Many solid rockets have chlorine in the form of perchlorate or other chemicals, and this can cause temporary local holes in the ozone layer. Re-entering spacecraft generate nitrates which also can temporarily impact the ozone layer. Most rockets are made of metals that can have an environmental impact during their construction.
While spaceflight altogether pollutes at a fraction of other human activities, it still does pollute heavily if calculated per passenger.

In addition to the atmospheric effects there are effects on the near-Earth space environment. There is the possibility that orbit could become inaccessible for generations due to exponentially increasing space debris caused by spalling of satellites and vehicles (Kessler syndrome). Many launched vehicles today are therefore designed to be re-entered after use.

Regulation 

A wide range of issues such as space traffic management or liability have been issues of spaceflight regulation.

Participation and representation of all humanity in spaceflight is an issue of international space law ever since the first phase of space exploration. Even though some rights of non-spacefaring countries have been secured, sharing of space for all humanity is still criticized as imperialist and lacking, understanding spaceflight as a resource.

Applications 

Current and proposed applications for spaceflight include:
 Earth observation satellites such as spy satellites, weather satellites
 Space exploration
 Communication satellites
 Satellite television
 Satellite navigation
 Space tourism
 Protecting Earth from potentially hazardous objects
 Space colonization

Most early spaceflight development was paid for by governments. However, today major launch markets such as communication satellites and satellite television are purely commercial, though many of the launchers were originally funded by governments.

Private spaceflight is a rapidly developing area: space flight that is not only paid for by corporations or even private individuals, but often provided by private spaceflight companies. These companies often assert that much of the previous high cost of access to space was caused by governmental inefficiencies they can avoid. This assertion can be supported by much lower published launch costs for private space launch vehicles such as Falcon 9 developed with private financing. Lower launch costs and excellent safety will be required for the applications such as space tourism and especially space colonization to become feasible for expansion.

Spacefaring

To be spacefaring is to be capable of and active in the operation of spacecraft. It involves a knowledge of a variety of topics and development of specialised skills including: aeronautics; astronautics; programs to train astronauts; space weather and forecasting; spacecraft operations; operation of various equipment; spacecraft design and construction; atmospheric takeoff and reentry; orbital mechanics (a.k.a. astrodynamics); communications; engines and rockets; execution of evolutions such as towing, microgravity construction, and space docking; cargo handling equipment, dangerous cargos and cargo storage; spacewalking; dealing with emergencies; survival at space and first aid; fire fighting; life support. The degree of knowledge needed within these areas is dependent upon the nature of the work and the type of vessel employed. "Spacefaring" is analogous to seafaring.

There has never been a crewed mission outside the Earth–Moon system. However, the United States, Russia, China, European Space Agency  (ESA) countries, and a few corporations and enterprises have plans in various stages to travel to Mars (see Human mission to Mars).

Spacefaring entities can be sovereign states, supranational entities, and private corporations. Spacefaring nations are those capable of independently building and launching craft into space. A growing number of private entities have become or are becoming spacefaring.

Global coordination 
The United Nations Office for Outer Space Affairs (UNOOSA) has been the main multilateral body servicing international contact and exchange on space activity among spacefaring and non-spacefaring states.

Crewed spacefaring nations

Currently Russia, China, and the United States are the only crewed spacefaring nations.
Spacefaring nations listed by year of first crewed launch:
 Soviet Union (Russia) (1961)
 United States (1961)
 China (2003)

Uncrewed spacefaring nations

The following nations or organizations have developed their own launch vehicles to launch uncrewed spacecraft into orbit either from their own territory or with foreign assistance (date of first launch in parentheses):

 Soviet Union (1957)
 United States (1958)
 France (1965)
 Italy (1967)★
 Australia  (1967)★
 Japan (1970)
 China (1970)
 United Kingdom (1971)
 European Space Agency (1979)
 India (1980)
 Israel (1988)
 Ukraine (1991)*
 Russia (1992)*
 Iran (2009)
 North Korea (2012)
 South Korea (2013)★
 New Zealand (2018)★
 *Previously a major region in the Soviet Union
 ★Launch vehicle fully or partially developed by another country

Also several countries, such as Canada, Italy and Australia, had semi-independent spacefaring capability, launching locally-built satellites on foreign launchers. Canada had designed and built satellites (Alouette 1 and 2) in 1962 and 1965 which were orbited using US launch vehicles. Italy has designed and built several satellites, as well as pressurized modules for the International Space Station. 
Early Italian satellites were launched using vehicles provided by NASA, first from Wallops Flight Facility in 1964 and then from a spaceport in Kenya (San Marco Platform) between 1967 and 1988; 
Italy has led the development of the Vega rocket programme within the European Space Agency since 1998.
The United Kingdom abandoned its independent space launch program in 1972 in favour of co-operating with the European Launcher Development Organisation (ELDO) on launch technologies until 1974. Australia abandoned its launcher program shortly after the successful launch of WRESAT, and became the only non-European member of ELDO.

Suborbital
Considering merely launching an object beyond the Kármán line to be the minimum requirement of spacefaring, Germany, with the V-2 rocket, became the first spacefaring nation in 1944. The following nations have only achieved suborbital spaceflight capability by launching indigenous rockets or missiles or both into suborbital space:

 Germany (June 20, 1944)
 East Germany (April 12, 1957)
 Canada (September 5, 1959)
 Lebanon (November 21, 1962)
 Switzerland (October 27, 1967)
 Argentina (April 16, 1969)
 Brazil (September 21, 1976)
 Spain (February 18, 1981)
 West Germany (March 1, 1981)
 Iraq (June 1984)
 South Africa (June 1, 1989)
 Sweden (May 8, 1991)
 Yemen (May 12, 1994)
 Pakistan (April 6, 1998)
 Taiwan (December 15, 1998)
 Syria (September 1, 2000)
 Indonesia (September 29, 2004)
 Democratic Republic of the Congo (2007)
 New Zealand (November 30, 2009)
 Norway (September 27, 2018)
 Netherlands (September 19, 2020)
Turkey (October 29, 2020)

See also 

 
 
 
 
 
 
 
 
 
 
 
 
 
 
 Space travel in science fiction

References

Further reading 
 Erik Gregerson (2010): An Explorer's Guide to the Universe – Unmanned Space Missions, Britannica Educational Publishing,  (eBook)

External links 

 Aerospace engineering at Wikiversity
 Encyclopedia Astronautica
 Basics of Spaceflight
 

 
Astronautics